The 2011 Eastern Kentucky Drillers season was the 1st season for the Ultimate Indoor Football League (UIFL) franchise. 
On November 26, 2010, the UIFL announced that the team in Pikeville, Kentucky would be named the Eastern Kentucky Drillers. The Drillers lost their first game in franchise history, a 44-49 defeat to the hands of the Saginaw Sting. Even in the defeat, two Drillers (Aric Evans and David Jones), won the first ever Offensive Player of the Week and Special Teams Player of the Week Awards in the history of the Ultimate Indoor Football League. The following week, the Drillers played their first ever home game at Eastern Kentucky Expo Center, and in front of 3,500 fans, the Drillers won 37-26 over the Huntington Hammer. The Drillers were able to finish the season with an 8-6 record. In the playoffs, they defeated the Huntington Hammer, and advanced to Ultimate Bowl I, where they lost to the Saginaw Sting.

Schedule
Key:

Regular season

Postseason schedule

Standings

Roster

Box Scores

Week 1: Eastern Kentucky Drillers vs. Saginaw Sting

References

Kentucky Drillers
Eastern Kentucky Drillers
Eastern Kentucky Drillers